Mabel is an unincorporated community in southwest Daviess County, in the U.S. state of Missouri.

Cameron is six miles to the south-southwest along Route 69.

History
A post office called Mabel was established in 1883, and remained in operation until 1936. The origin or namesake of the name Mabel is uncertain.

References

Unincorporated communities in Daviess County, Missouri
Unincorporated communities in Missouri